Australia has more skyscrapers per person than any other country in the world with a population greater than five million, and was one of the first countries in the world to play host to the skyscraper boom along with the United States and Canada. Australia's first skyscraper as then defined was Melbourne's now demolished APA Building, completed in 1889, which was among the tallest buildings in the world at the time. The nation's first skyscraper as defined today by the Council on Tall Buildings and Urban Habitat as buildings exceeding 150 metres was the Australia Square Tower in Sydney, completed in 1967.

The vast majority of Australia's buildings which exceed 150 metres in height are located in the eastern states of Victoria, New South Wales, and Queensland, with a smaller number in Western Australia. While Australia's other states and territories contain no skyscrapers as defined, they all play host to numerous high-rise buildings.

Tallest buildings 

This list includes the tallest completed and topped out buildings in Australia that reach a height of at least , ranked by their official heights as defined by the Council on Tall Buildings and Urban Habitat (CTBUH). An equal sign (=) following a rank indicates the same height between two or more buildings (in such cases, the building with the highest number of floors is listed first). The "Year" column indicates the year of completion. The list includes only habitable buildings, as opposed to structures such as observation towers, radio masts, transmission towers and chimneys.

Official heights (denoted by "O") are also known as "architectural heights", as they include spires but exclude communications masts and antennae. This is because spires form an integral part of a building's design while masts and antennae do not, being purely functional. Also included are heights "excluding spires" ("ES"), which as used here include the entire architectural structure save for architectural spires. Whilst this is not a measure used by CTBUH, the concept is nonetheless frequently referred to by skyscraper aficionados.

The Sydney Tower completed in 1981, was the first structure in any city in Australia to climb above 300m / 1,000ft standing at 
309 m (1,014 ft). However it is not included in this list as it does not qualify as a skyscraper due to it having only 4 floors . The bulk of the structure above the base consists of a communications and observation tower.

Tallest buildings under construction or proposed
This list includes the tallest buildings over 200 m that are currently under construction, approved or proposed in Australia according to the CTBUH, save for those which have already topped out.

Tallest buildings by state or territory 
The following table provides the tallest building (completed or topped out) in each state given that only New South Wales, Queensland, Victoria, and Western Australia are currently featured in the lists of tallest buildings to architectural detail and to roof. Heights to architectural detail are used.

The following table lists future tallest buildings that if built, could become the tallest buildings in their respective state or territory.

Cities with the most skyscrapers
This table shows Australian cities with at least one skyscraper over 150 metres in height, completed, topped–out or under construction. 

Notes
N1.  Of a total 67 skyscrapers, 20 are under construction or have topped-out
N2.  Of a total 50 skyscrapers, 14 are under construction or have topped-out
N3.  Of a total 20 skyscrapers, 4 are under construction or have topped-out
N4.  Of a total 9 skyscrapers, 2 are under construction or have topped-out
N5.  Of a total 5 skyscrapers, 1 is under construction or has topped-out

See also

 List of tallest structures in Australia
 List of tallest buildings in Oceania
 List of cities in Australia with the most skyscrapers

References

 
Australia